Festuca dahurica is a species of grass in the family Poaceae. This species is native to Buryatiya, China North-Central, Chita, Inner Mongolia, Manchuria, Mongolia, and Qinghai. Festuca dahurica prefers temperate biomes and is perennial. This species was first described in 1934.

References

dahurica